895 Helio is a large dark outer main-belt asteroid about 150 km in diameter. It was discovered on 11 July 1918 by German astronomer Max Wolf. It is named after the element helium, whose spectrum was studied by Friedrich Paschen and Carl David Tolmé Runge, with the asteroid being named by Paschen at Wolf's request; the name helium itself comes from Helios, the Greek god of the Sun.

This is a B-type asteroid. The best spectral analog for 895 Heloi is the iron rich pyroxene mineral hedenbergite. It shares similar orbital properties with the 31 Euphrosyne asteroid family, but is most likely an interloper. Light curve analysis provides a rotation period of 9.4 hours.

References

External links
 
 

000895
Discoveries by Max Wolf
Named minor planets
000895
000895
19180711